The following lists events that happened during 1914 in South Africa.

Incumbents
 Monarch: King George V.
 Governor-General and High Commissioner for Southern Africa:
 The Viscount Gladstone (until 27 July).
 Baron De Villiers (acting, 27 July to 2 September).
 Sir James Rose Innes (acting, 2 to 8 September).
 The Viscount Buxton (from 8 September).
 Prime Minister: Louis Botha.
 Chief Justice: Baron De Villiers then Sir James Rose Innes

Events
January
 8 – A railway strike is declared in the Transvaal and Orange River Colony.

April
 23 – The Afrikaans language receives official recognition when Cornelis Jacobus Langenhoven addresses the English caucus of the Cape Provincial Council.

July
 1 – The National Party is formed in Bloemfontein.
 18 – Mahatma Gandhi leaves South Africa for the last time, sailing out of Cape Town for England on board the SS Kinfauns Castle.

 September
 8 – The Viscount Buxton is appointed the second Governor-General of the Union of South Africa.
 10 – South Africa declares war on Germany.
 13 – South African troops open hostilities in German South-West Africa with an assault on the Ramansdrift police station.
 15 – The Maritz Rebellion against the government of the Union of South Africa begins.

Unknown date
 The steamship Clan Stuart is blown ashore between Glencairn and Simon's Town in the Cape Province.
 The Kimberley mine or "Big Hole" is closed.
 South Africa's government agree to many of the Indians' demands. Discriminatory taxes on Indian traders are abolished, the legality of non-Christian marriages is recognized and the continued immigration of free Indians is permitted.
 A new lighthouse is built at Cape Point.

Births
 3 July – Pat Pattle, World War II fighter pilot. (d. 1941)
 20 February – John Charles Daly, South African-born journalist, game show host (d. 1991)
 9 December – Shmuel Katz, Israeli writer, historian and journalist. (d. 2008)

Deaths
 15 September – Koos de la Rey, Boer War general, is shot dead at a police roadblock. (b. 1847)

Railways

Railway lines opened
 1 January – Cape – Kleipan to Birdfield, .
 5 January – Natal – Winterton to Bergville, .
 2 February – Natal – Ixopo to Madonela (Narrow gauge), .
 23 February – Natal – Ahrens to Kranskop, .
 4 March – Free State – Marsala to Frankfort, .
 3 April – Cape – Gamtoos to Patensie (Narrow gauge), .
 6 April – Cape – Caledon to Klipdale, .
 5 May – Transvaal – Lilliput to Messina, .
 18 May – Transvaal – Sabie to Graskop, .
 25 May – Transvaal – Cranbourne to Modderbee, .
 September – Natal – Newleigh to Estcourt deviation, .
 21 December – Transvaal – Bethal to Morgenzon, .

Locomotives
Six new Cape gauge locomotive types enter service on the South African Railways (SAR):
 Forty-one Class 14A 4-8-2 Mountain type steam locomotives.
 Ten Class 15  Mountain type locomotives.
 The first of 119 Class 15A 4-8-2 Mountain type locomotives.
 Twelve Class 16 4-6-2 Pacific type passenger steam locomotives.
 Fifteen Class MC1 2-6-6-0 Mallet articulated compound steam locomotives.
 Only two of the ten Class MJ 2-6-6-0 Mallet compound locomotives ordered from German manufacturer Maffei before the outbreak of World War I disrupts further delivery.

References

South Africa
Years in South Africa
History of South Africa